Conformity is the process by which an individual's attitudes, beliefs, and behaviors are influenced by other people.

Conformity may also refer to:
Conformity: A Tale, a novel by Charlotte Elizabeth Tonna
Conformity, the closeness of an individual dog to its breed's standard, judged in a conformation show

See also
 Conformist (Church of England)
 Unconformity, a buried erosion surface or fault
 Asch conformity experiments
 Certificate of conformity, regarding a type approval
 Confirmation (disambiguation)
 Form (disambiguation)